Robert Rogers (born 12 November 1983) is a referee in football and futsal. He is currently on the FIFA International Referees List as a football referee.

Football refereeing
Rogers was appointed to the National League panel of referees in 2005 as an assistant referee. Rogers took charge of his first League of Ireland match in 2007 in which Athlone Town beat Kildare County by 4 goals to 2.

He became FIFA-listed as a referee in 2012.

Futsal refereeing
Rob Rogers was appointed to the FIFA International List for Futsal Referees for the 2009 season. In doing so he became the first referee from Ireland to hold this position.

He has officiated at the Four Nations championship held in England in December 2008, taking charge of the opening fixture between Libya and Lithuania and the final match between hosts England and Libya before a packed house in Loughborough.

 Rogers was appointed to the  preliminary qualifying stages of the UEFA Futsal Championship in February 2009
 Rob Rogers was appointed to the 2009–10 UEFA Futsal Cup Preliminary Group F held in Austria, August 2009
 Rob Rogers was appointed as Second Referee to the inaugural FAI Futsal Cup final in 2007 in which Shamrock Rovers beat UCD.
 Rob Rogers was appointed as First Referee at the FAI Futsal Cup final in 2009 held at the National Basketball Arena. Cork City beat defending Champions St. Patrick's Athletic.

References

Futsal referees
Republic of Ireland football referees
1983 births
Living people
Futsal in the Republic of Ireland